The Niagara Escarpment Biosphere Reserve (established 1990) is a UNESCO Biosphere Reserve located in Ontario, Canada.  The reserve stretches  along the Niagara Escarpment from Lake Ontario (near Niagara Falls) to the tip of the Bruce Peninsula (between Georgian Bay and Lake Huron). The Escarpment corridor crosses two major biomes: needle leaf forests in the north and temperate broadleaf forest in the south.

Area 

Ecological characteristics 
The Niagara Escarpment represents the largest contiguous stretch of primarily forested land in south-central Ontario. These habitats collectively boast the highest level of species diversity among Canadian biosphere reserves, including more than 300 bird species, 55 mammals, 36 reptiles and amphibians, 90 fish and 100 varieties of special interest flora.

The Niagara Escarpment stretches  along the entire eastern edge of the Bruce Peninsula, a globally significant area covering  at the tip of which lies Bruce Peninsula National Park. Within the park the escarpment forms the Georgian Bay shoreline and constitutes part of the core area of the biosphere reserve. The park consists of an array of habitats ranging from rare alvars to dense forests and clean lakes, with over 1,000-year-old cedar trees growing among the rugged cliffs. Along with Fathom Five National Marine Park, the Bruce Peninsula National Park facilitates access to the shores of Lake Huron, the fifth largest freshwater lake in the world.

Socio-economic characteristics 

The combined population of all the upper and single tier areas that span the Niagara Escarpment Biosphere Reserve amounts to approximately 1,313,000 people, according to the 2011 Canadian census.

Economic development varies throughout the biosphere reserve in accordance with the diverse landscapes, natural resources and cultural attractions found along the Niagara Escarpment. Some local communities are facing lifestyle changes as new economies emerge, while others are coping with static, decreasing or aging populations and are searching for new ways to maintain the viability of local economies and cultures. Development pressures related to population growth in southern Ontario are also increasing, in particular the need for construction materials, residential expansion and provision of access to recreation spaces. 

Prevailing trends over the past decade in the main sectors of the economy include the sustainable use of natural resources, mineral resource extraction, agro-tourism, production of local food and Niagara peninsula wine, and eco-tourism.

Gallery

See also 
 Biosphere Reserves of Canada
 Greenbelt (Golden Horseshoe)

Sources

References 

Biosphere reserves of Canada
Protected areas of Ontario